Glaucocharis interruptus is a moth in the family Crambidae. It was first described by Cajetan von Felder, Rudolf Felder and Alois Friedrich Rogenhofer in 1875 and named Crambus interruptus. It is endemic to New Zealand.

References

Diptychophorini
Moths described in 1875
Moths of New Zealand
Endemic fauna of New Zealand
Endemic moths of New Zealand